Thomas Ion Victor Ferguson known as Ion Ferguson Royal Army Medical Corps (1913 - 1990) was an Irish volunteer for the British army who escaped from Oflag IV-C, Colditz Castle, during the Second World War.

He was born in Ireland to parents Ion Ferguson (1882 - 1962) and Annie Victoria Makin Ferguson.  They married in 1912 the year before Ion's birth.  His father died aged 79 in 1962.  His father also had a brother named Sidney Clement Ferguson

Ferguson was captured by the Germans in Greece in 1941 and held as a POW until 1945. He was moved to Colditz Castle after protesting to the German authorities about the treatment of prisoners. According to Punch magazine, "Dr. Ferguson is a typical Irish rebel who kicked against the authority of senior officers until becoming a P.O.W., when he would not allow the Germans to ill-treat anyone without voluble protest. His intransigence landed him in Colditz..."

Whilst incarcerated in Colditz in a ploy to attract the attention of the German authorities, Ferguson wrote a letter to an Irish friend, the son of Éamon de Valera, the Irish Taoiseach, in which he called for Ireland to join the war on the Allies' side. As intended, the letter was stopped by the German censors but his wish to be moved to another prison camp was granted and he was moved to Stalag IV-D. In Stalag IV-D, he coached two RAF prisoners to convincingly simulate schizophrenia, who were consequently repatriated, while waiting for his own repatriation to Britain in the same way.

Ferguson is described by the Lancashire Telegraph as a "brave, no-nonsense Irish doctor".

Ferguson wrote a biography of his wartime experiences in Doctor at War (1957).

Ferguson is survived by four children, John Aidan Ferguson (born 1949), Deidre, Ann and Geraldine Ferguson.

Bibliography

 Doctor at War, Panther Books, (1957)

References

1913 births
1990 deaths
British Army personnel of World War II
Prisoners of war held at Colditz Castle
Royal Army Medical Corps officers
World War II prisoners of war held by Germany
20th-century Irish medical doctors